Cassipourea acuminata is a species of plant in the Rhizophoraceae family. It is found in Cameroon, the Democratic Republic of the Congo, and Gabon. Its natural habitats are subtropical or tropical moist lowland forests and subtropical or tropical swamps. It is threatened by habitat loss.

References

acuminata
Endangered plants
Taxonomy articles created by Polbot